The  was a class of submarine chasers of the Imperial Japanese Navy (IJN), serving during World War II. Three vessels were built in 1933-36 under the Maru 1 Programme and the Maru 2 Programme. They have two sub classes.

Background
 In World War I, German U-boat raged. The IJN began maintenance of an anti-submarine boat as a lesson in this, because Japanese shoreline and sea-lanes were very long. The IJN had some submarine chaser type tugboats and yard ferries. However, they were small and their speed was low.
 The IJN wanted to give the anti-submarine boats a speed of more than 20 knots, because their Kaidai III submarine already achieved a 20kt surfaced.

Design
 The Naval Technical Department (Kampon) made draft shallow to give them high speed. They achieved 24 kt speed hereby.
 The No. 1 and the No. 2 were completed in March 1934, and they were assigned to the 1st Submarine Chaser Division, Yokosuka Naval Defence Squadron.
 However, because of their very shallow draft they lacked the rolling performance. This fact become evident after the Tomozuru incident.
 The Tomozuru incident affected the No. 1-class. The No. 1 and the No. 2 were sent to the Uraga Dock Company in July 1934, and repairs were started. They were equipped 80 tons ballast and mounted a ballast keel. The drawings for the No. 3-class boat was also revised.

Service
 Late 1934, Repairs were completed.
 October 1936, The No. 3 assigned to 1st SchDiv. They always shared an action afterward.
 In 1938, the 1st SchDiv was transferred to the No. 1 Base Force (Shanghai).
 On 5 September 1941, the No. 1 Base Force was transferred to the 2nd Fleet.
 In December 1941 – March 1942, the 1st SchDiv engaged to the Battle of the Philippines and Dutch East Indies campaign.
 On 10 March 1942, the 1st SchDiv was transferred to the No. 21 Special Base Force (Surabaya), 2nd Southern Expeditionary Fleet, Southwest Area Fleet.
 On 1 May 1942: The 1st SchDiv was dissolved. They spent all their time for escort operations in the Java Area.

Ships in classes

No.1-class
 Project number was K3. 2 vessels were built under the Maru 1 Programme. They equipped the MV hydrophone by Submarine signal company and latest active sonar the Type 93.

No.3-class
 Project number was K4. Only 1 vessel was built under the Maru 2 Programme. The No. 3 was equipped the French SCAM active sonar and latest hydrophone the Type 93. The No. 3 was classed in the No. 1-class in the IJN official documents.

Photos

Footnotes

Bibliography
 Ships of the World special issue Vol. 45, Escort Vessels of the Imperial Japanese Navy, (Japan), 1996.
 The Maru Special, Japanese Naval Vessels No. 49, Japanese submarine chasers and patrol boats,  (Japan), 1981.

World War II naval ships of Japan
Submarine chaser classes
Submarine chasers of the Imperial Japanese Navy